Kyrgyzstan is one of the twenty-four participating countries and regions competing in the Turkvision Song Contest.

History
Kyrgyzstan made their debut in the inaugural  contest in Eskişehir, Turkey, with the song "Kaygırba" performed by Çoro. The song placed 8th in the final with 183 points, the country's worst result as of 2019.

Kyrgyzstani broadcaster KRTK has always organised a national final to select the country's entries. In 2013, the national final selected only the artist, but in 2014 and 2015, the national final selected both the artist and the song.

Kyrgyzstan had confirmed their participation in the  contest before its cancellation. 

Participation overview

Related involvement

Jury members

See also 
 Kyrgyzstan in the ABU Radio Song Festival
 Kyrgyzstan in the ABU TV Song Festival

References 

 
Countries in the Turkvision Song Contest